Nicolò Paganini may refer to:

Niccolò Paganini (1782–1840), Italian composer
Nicolò Paganini's numbers (c. 1850–?), Italian mathematician who found a pair of amicable numbers

See also
 Paganini (disambiguation)